WILL may refer to:

WILL (AM), a radio station (580 AM), licensed to Urbana, Illinois, United States
WILL-FM, a radio station (90.9 FM), licensed to Urbana, Illinois, United States
WILL-TV, a television station (PSIP 12/RF 9), licensed to Urbana, Illinois, United States
Wisconsin Institute for Law and Liberty, a conservative law firm
 Women in Law and Litigation ("WILL"), in India

See also
 Will (disambiguation)